Gualba is a municipality in Catalonia, Spain. It is in Barcelona Province in the comarca of Vallès Oriental. , the population was 1,429.

The town is at the foot of the Montseny Massif, near the Santa Fe Reservoir.

References

External links
  
 Government data pages 

Municipalities in Vallès Oriental